Hamza Hakimzade Niyazi (Kokand – March 18, 1929, Shohimardon) was an Uzbek author, composer, playwright, poet, scholar, and political activist. Niyazi, along with Gʻafur Gʻulom, is widely seen as one of the leading figures in the early development of modern Uzbek literary tradition. He is generally considered the first Uzbek playwright, the founder of modern Uzbek musical forms, as well as the founder of Uzbek social realism.

Niyazi also participated in the controversial Uzbek language reforms of the 1920s, which were meant to codify a literary Uzbek language in place of the older, fading Chagatai. In addition to Uzbek, Niyazi knew many other languages, including Arabic, Persian, Russian, and Turkish. His works generally dealt with social issues, such as women's rights, social inequality, and the prevalence of superstition. Niyazi was stoned to death in the town of Shohimardon, by Islamic fundamentalists on the accusation of anti-religious activities.

Niyazi became a National Writer of the Uzbek SSR in 1926. To honor his memory, in 1967 the Central Committee of the Communist Party of Uzbekistan established the State Hamza Prize to recognize outstanding achievement in literature, arts, and architecture. Many institutions in Uzbekistan, including a station of Tashkent Metro, three theaters, as well as several schools and streets are named after him.

Life 
Hamza Hakimzade Niyazi was born on March 6, 1889, in Kokand to a family of healers. His father, Ibn Yamin Niyoz oʻgʻli (1840—1922), knew Uzbek and Tajik/ Persian and was keen on literature. His mother, Jahonbibi Rabiboy qizi (1858—1903), was also a healer. Niyazi was first educated in a maktab, then in a madrassah. Having organized a free school for the children of the poor, Niyazi devoted himself to the project in the capacity of a teacher. He himself wrote primers for children, such as Yengil adabiyot (Easy Literature) (1914), Oʻqish kitobi (Reading Book) (1914), and Qiroat kitobi (Reading with Intonation) (1915).

Niyazi ardently supported the Bolshevik Revolution of 1917. He joined the All-Russian Communist Party (The Bolsheviks) in 1920 and, among other things, organized a theater troop for the entertainment of Red Army soldiers. In addition to Uzbek, Niyazi knew many other languages, including Arabic, Persian, Russian, and Turkish.

Niyazi's early writings exhibit strong social-democratic leanings and sharp condemnations of social injustice. His works generally dealt wish social issues, such as women's rights, social inequality, and the prevalence of superstition. 

An ardent supporter of the revolution, Niyazi was stoned to death in the town of Shohimardon by nationalists and Islamic fundamentalists for his anti-religious activities.

Works 
Hamza Hakimzade Niyazi wrote his earliest poems under the pen name Nihoniy. His earliest collection of poems, Devoni Nihoniy (Nihoniy's Diwan), was found in 1949 and had 197 poems that he had written in 1903–04.

Niyazi extolled the Russian Revolution and was directly connected with the struggle for social justice and liberation in Uzbekistan. Many of Niyazi's works, including his poems, dramas, and other writings were often written in the turmoil of revolution and describe Niyazi's view of the awakening of Uzbek class consciousness. Niyazi's novels are generally moralistic and focus on showcasing and condemning those aspects of Uzbek society the author considered backward and detrimental to both individual and national development.

In his first novel, Yangi saodat (New Prosperity) (1915), Niyazi extols the benefits of education. The book was written to showcase the author's belief in the power of modern education to end superstitions and to allow a human being to reach his full potential and improve not only his own life, but also the lives of those around him. In the novel, Niyazi tells the story of a poorly educated young man who marries and has two children before becoming a drunkard and a gambler and eventually leaving the family. His wife takes care of her son, who, in contrast to his father, completes his education. The son then finds his now destitute father and reunites the family.

In Zaharli hayot yoxud Ishq qurbonlari (Poisonous Life or the Victims of Love), Niyazi portrays a young couple, the 18-year-old son of a well-to-do family and the 17-year-old daughter of a craftsman. The couple's love is thwarted by the inflexible attitudes of the boy's parents who stick closely to their rigid ideas about social structure. The young people eventually commit suicide — they become victims of the feudal class system.

Niyazi also wrote Boy ila xizmatchi (The Bey and The Servant) (1918) which deals primarily with the revolutionary upheaval in Western Turkestan and with the institution of arranged marriage. In the story, the young heroine commits suicide after being forced to marry a man she does not love.

One of the author's final works is Paranji sirlaridan bir lavha Yoki yallachilar ishi (One Episode from the Secrets of the Veil or the Case of Yalla Singers) (1922) which describes the problems faced by Uzbek women.

In addition to his explicitly political novels, Niyazi is also known for his anthologies of folk songs and melodies. In his anthologies, Niyazi collected about 40 songs, mostly Uzbek, but also Kashgar and Tatar melodies. Niyazi himself was a master of several traditional Uzbek instruments, especially the dotar and the tanbur.

Niyazi also wrote two comedies: Tuhmatchilar jazosi (The Punishment of Slanderers) (1918) and Burungi qozilar yoxud Maysaraning ishi (Old Judges or the Case of Maysara) (1926).

Legacy 

Niyazi is one of the most important early representatives of a distinctive Uzbek literature. He is generally considered the first Uzbek playwright, the founder of modern Uzbek musical forms, as well as the founder of Uzbek social realism. His writings were also significant for being "ideologically valuable" in the early years of Soviet power in Uzbekistan. Although socialist realism became the "official" style of Uzbek literature only in 1932, Niyazi is generally credited as the founder of the movement. In his book The Politics of Muslim Cultural Reform: Jadidism in Central Asia, Adeeb Khalid, whose research focuses on Central Asian history, writes that it is difficult to imagine the history of modern Central Asian literature without Niyazi.

Niyazi also participated in the controversial Uzbek language reforms of the 1920s which were meant to codify a literary Uzbek language in place of the older, fading Chagatai. Chagatai had been the dominant written form for several centuries. The reforms eventually resulted in a significant shift in spelling and pronunciation.

Although Niyazi's political legacy is complex, he undoubtedly helped develop the national literature of Uzbekistan. Jadidist and nationalist writers saw Niyazi's pro-Soviet position as inherently un-Uzbek because of its non-national and political themes.

Niyazi became a National Writer of the Uzbek SSR in 1926. To honor his memory, in 1967 the Central Committee of the Communist Party of Uzbekistan established the State Hamza Prize to recognize outstanding achievement in literature, arts, and architecture. Many institutions in Uzbekistan, including a station of Tashkent Metro, three theaters, as well as several schools and streets are named after him. There are two museums of Niyazi in Kokand.

See also 
Ali-Shir Nava'i
Chagatai language
Furqat
Uzbek language

References

Bibliography 

 .
 .
 .
 .
 .
 .
 .
 .
 .
 .
 .
 .
 .

External links

 Adeeb Khalid: Printing, Publishing, and Reform in Tsarist Central Asia. 1994 
 Mark Dickens: Uzbek Music . 1989 
 Mark Dickens: The Uzbeks . 1990 
 

1889 births
1929 deaths
People from Kokand 
People from Fergana Oblast
20th-century novelists
20th-century Uzbekistani poets
Jadids
Bolsheviks
Communist Party of the Soviet Union members
Uzbeks
Poets from the Russian Empire
Male writers from the Russian Empire
Russian male poets
People murdered in the Soviet Union
Soviet poets
Soviet male writers
Former Muslims
20th-century atheists
20th-century male writers
People killed in the Hujum
Uzbekistani male poets
Uzbekistani writers
Russian male novelists
Deaths by stoning
Uzbekistani Arabic-language poets